Parandzem (died winter 369/70) was the consort of King Arshak II of Armenia. She was a member of the noble house of Siwni. She was regent of Armenia during the absence of her spouse and son in 368–370, and is famous for her defense of the fortress of Artagers against Persia. She was brutally put to death by the Persians after the fall of Artagers in the winter of 369/70. Her son Pap was soon after restored to the throne with Roman assistance.

Early life
Parandzem was the daughter of Andovk Siwni, a senior nakharar of the princely house of Siwni, which ruled the Siwnik province of Armenia. Her paternal uncle Valinak Siak c.330, was the first known nakharar of the Siwni dynasty in the Syunik Province, while Valinak's successor and brother who was Parandzem's father, Andovk served as the nakharar of Syunik in c.340. Parandzem's mother was an unnamed noblewoman from the Mamikonian family and she had at least one known sibling, a brother called Babik (Bagben) who served as a Naxarar of Syunik in 379. Little is known of her early life. Parandzem was extremely well known for her beauty and modesty.

First marriage
Parandzem in 359 married the Arsacid Prince Gnel. Gnel was the son of the Arsacid Prince Tiridates whose brother was Arshak II who ruled as King of Armenia from 350 until 368. During the reign of Arsaces II, Gnel was a popular prince in Armenia and could have been seen as a potential successor to his uncle.

Parandzem's reputation for her beauty had become renown and widespread to the point as Gnel's paternal cousin Tirit had become passionately in love with her and desired for her to be his wife. Finding a way to plot against his cousin Gnel, Tirit approached their uncle Arsaces II and said to him: “Gnel wants to rule, and to kill you. All the grandees, the Naxarars and the Azats like Gnel and all the Naxarars of the land prefer his lordship over them than yours. Now they say, ‘look and see what you do, king, so that you can save yourself”. Believing the words of Tirit, Arsaces II became agitated and did confirm the statements of Tirit.

Murder of Gnel
Arsaces II from then until Gnel's death had a grudge against Gnel which he had frequently tried to persecute and plot treachery against him for a long time.   From that moment Gnel was on the run with Parandzem from Arsaces II.  Arsaces II did eventually kill Gnel around the time of the festival of Nawasard (which was held in August) as his falsely lured his nephew and Parandzem into Shahapivan a native camping place of the Arsacids which was below a walled hunting preserve based on a lie that Arsaces II wanted to reconcile with Gnel.    When Gnel was captured by Arsaces II's soldiers he was taken to a nearby hill of the mountain called Lsin where he was executed. After the death and burial of Gnel, Arsaces II issued an order to mourn the death of his nephew which Arsaces II weep and mourn for Gnel greatly while Parandzem mourned so much for Gnel she tore off her clothes, was screaming and cried so much.

Now Tirit had successfully got rid of his cousin, he was unable to control his lust for Parandzem. Tirit had sent his messenger to Parandzem a note reading: “Do not mourn so much, for I am a better man that he was. I loved you and therefore betrayed him to death, so that I could take you in marriage”.   In her mourning Parandzem, raised a protest, pulling out her hair and screaming as she mourned that her husband died because of her.

When the Armenians in particular Arsaces II heard the cries of Parandzem, Arsaces II began to realise the plotting of Tirit and the senseless death of Gnel. Arsaces II was stunned in what happened and had regretted in killing Gnel. For a while Arsaces II, didn't do anything to Tirit. Tirit had sent a message to Arsaces II stating, “King, I want you to order that I be allowed to marry Gnel’s wife”. As Arsaces II heard this he said: “Now I know for sure that what I have heard is accurate. Gnel’s death occurred for his wife”. Arsaces II planned to kill Tirit in return for Gnel's murder. When Tirit heard this, he was in so much fear for Arsaces II he fled at night. Arsaces II was informed that Tirit had left and ordered his soldiers to find Tirit and kill him. His soldiers found Tirit in the forests in the district of Basen and killed him there.

Second marriage

After the death of Tirit, Arsaces II married Parandzem. Parandzem married Arsaces II as her second husband.  At the same time as Arsaces II had Parandzem as his wife, he also had another wife, a Greek Cretan noblewoman woman called Olympia, also known as Olympias whom he married before marrying Parandzem. Olympia the Roman wife of Arsaces II, was given to him as an imperial bride from the Roman emperor Constantius II as Arsaces II was greatly favored by the emperor, who considered him as an ally to Rome.

Although the Romans considered Olympia as the legitimate wife of Arsaces II, he loved Parandzem to a degree but Parandzem loathed Arsaces II saying, “Physically, he is hairy, and his color is dark”. Arsaces II loved Olympia more than Parandzem. Through marriage to Arsaces II, Parandzem became an Armenian Queen consort and a very powerful, wealthy and influential woman in Armenian society.

Sometime after her marriage to Arsaces II, Parandzem fell pregnant. In 360 Parandzem bore Arsaces II a son, whom they named Papas (Pap). Papas was the only known child born to Parandzem and the only known child born to Arsaces II during his Armenian Kingship. Parandzem was also a stepmother to Anob, as Anob was the first son of Arsaces II born to him from a previous union prior to his Kingship of Armenia.

Queen of Armenia
As Arsaces II in Persian fashion had more than one wife Parandzem had a grudge and had a great envy against Olympia.    After the birth of her son, Parandzem plotted to kill Olympia through poison. Parandzem had arranged for Olympia to be poisoned in 361 administered to her in the Holy Sacrament of communion by a priest from the royal court.    Olympia was extremely careful in where she accepted matters of food and drink from as she only accepted food and drink offered to her from her maids.   The behaviours, actions of Parandzem and Arsaces II, in particular the deaths of Gnel, Tirit, Olympia and possibly the prior ruling King of Armenia Tigranes VII (Tiran) had totally outraged the reigning Catholicos St. Nerses I. The church was totally alienated from the royal court of Arsaces II and St. Nerses I was not seen again in the royal court in the lifetime of Arsaces II.    Although Parandzem was hostile to any Sassanid influence from Persia; the actions of Parandzem towards Olympia had placed Armenian politics unfavorable to Christian interests and she was considered an impious woman. After the death of Olympia, Parandzem became the Armenian Queen.

In the year 367 or 368 the Sassanid King Shapur II, had turned to treachery to capture Arsaces II as he was taken as a political prisoner by the Sassanid monarch, in which Arsaces II had died in prison. This was a part of Shapur II's plan to conquer Armenia once and for all, as Shapur II was in military conflict and failed diplomatic treaties with the Roman emperors Jovian and Valens.  Shapur II after successfully capturing Arsaces II, he sent his army to invade Armenia.

Defender of Artogerassa
When the Sassanid army were heading to invade Armenia, Parandzem and her son, Papas took the Armenian treasury and hid themselves in the fortress of Artogerassa, where the fortress was defended by a troops of Azats. The Armenian invasion was led by Cylaces and Artabanes, two Armenians who defected to Shapur II. Cylaces and Artabanes were also supported by the Armenian nobles Vahan Mamikonian and Meruzhan Artsruni who also defected to Shapur II. Shapur II wanted to suppress Arsacid rule in Armenia and replace the dynasty with Persian administrators and traditional Armenian aristocrat Lords to govern over Armenia.

Parandzem was able to have initiate negotiations with Cylaces and Artabanes for the surrender of the fortress during that time. Parandzem appealed to them in the name of her husband. Cylaces and Artabanes defected from Shapur II to Parandzem in which Papas for his safety was sent to Asia Minor to the court of Valens. Papas during his time with Valens was in communication with his mother from the fortress whom he encouraged to await his rescue.

Valens was working to restore Papas to the Arsacid throne and withdraw the army of Shapur II from Armenia. When Shapur II heard of Papas’ restoration to Armenia, instead of going after Papas personally he concentrated in capturing Parandzem; ending her siege in the fortress of Artogerassa and invading Armenia. The Persian forces that were sent by Shapur II finally conquered Armenia and captured the fortress after two years. Parandzem bravely defended herself and Armenia for 2 years from Shapur II, which famine and disease had left few survivors out of 11,000 soldiers and 6,000 women who had taken refuge in the fortress.

Parandzem with the Armenian royal treasure were taken to the palace of Shapur II. Shapur II wanting to humiliate Armenia and the Roman Empire, had Parandzem given to his soldiers whom they brutally raped until she died, although, Movses Khorenatsi never mentioned that, rather, he stated that she was taken away into captivity in Assyria, where she was impaled on the shafts of carts and put to death. After her death, Papas was restored to his Armenian Kingship by Valens.

Notes

References

Sources
 Faustus of Byzantium, History of the Armenians, 5th Century
 The conversion of Armenia to the Christian faith, William St. Clair Tisdall, Princeton University, 1897
 N. Lenski, Failure of Empire: Valens and the Roman State in the Fourth Century A.D., University of California Press, 2003
 R.G. Hovannisian, The Armenian People From Ancient to Modern Times, Volume I: The Dynastic Periods: From Antiquity to the Fourteenth Century, Palgrave Macmillan, 2004
 V.M. Kurkjian, A History of Armenia, Indo-European Publishing, 2008
 E. Gibbon, The History of the Decline and Fall of the Roman Empire (Google eBook), MobileReference, 2009

Armenian queens consort
4th-century Armenian people
Roman client rulers
Foreign relations of ancient Rome
4th-century women rulers
Siunia dynasty
Women in 4th-century warfare
Rape in Armenia
Women in war in Western Asia